Middle American burrowing snake may refer to:

 Adelphicos visoninum, a harmless snake species found in Mexico and Guatemala.
 Adelphicos quadrivirgatum, a harmless snake species found in Belize, Guatemala, Honduras, Nicaragua, and Mexico
 Adelphicos newmanorum, a harmless snake species found in Mexico